Chandrakant Raghuwanshi is an Indian politician and leader of Shiv Sena from Nandurbar district. He was a member of Maharashtra Legislative Council.

Positions held
 2014: Elected to Maharashtra Legislative Council

See also
 List of members of the Maharashtra Legislative Council

References

External links
 The Shivsena

Shiv Sena politicians
Members of the Maharashtra Legislative Council
Marathi politicians
Living people
1959 births